Return to the Lost World is a 1992 film directed by Timothy Bond and starring John Rhys-Davies, Eric McCormack, David Warner, Nathania Stanford, Darren Peter Mercer, and Tamara Gorski. It is a sequel to the film The Lost World, which was released the same year.

Plot
Belgian scientist Bertram Hammonds, along with Gomez, who survived being injured in the first film, arrives in the Lost World to drill for crude oil. He and his men begin capturing the natives for slave labor, throwing Chief Palala off the top of the plateau. He survives and is rescued by Malu and taken to a nearby village. Word reaches Edward Malone and Jenny Nielson in England, who remind Professors Challenger and Summerlee of the promise they made to Palala: that they would return to the Lost World should they be needed.

However the professors are having a feud. Challenger recently discredited Summerlee on a theory and now they aren't on speaking terms. With help from Jim, Malone and Jenny manage to bamboozle Challenger and Summerlee into coming along with each mistakenly believing they are commanding the expedition while the other is remaining in England. When they encounter one another aboard the steamship bound for Africa, they nearly come to blows. Upon arriving they are led to the base of the plateau by Malu, where she found Chief Palala.

Above, attacks by dinosaurs have set back Hammonds' work. His drilling crews accidentally tap into a volcanic pipe during a tyrannosaurus' visit, triggering a volcanic eruption that threatens to destroy the whole plateau. The initial eruption destroys the plane they arrived in. Fleeing, Hammonds and Gomez take Chief Palala's daughter hostage and threaten to kill her unless the natives show them how to leave. Suddenly Challenger and the others arrive, having come the same way they left last time, through the caves.

Challenger shoots and kills Gomez, and Hammonds is taken prisoner. After several adventures including clashes with the hostile drilling crew members, the group struggles to stop the erupting volcano. Challenger creates a new explosive, "Challengerite," with which to seal the volcano. Boxes of the explosive are put into a cave nearby but Hammonds chases Jim inside, not wanting them to set off the explosives. He tries to ply Jim with promises of wealth but Jim sets off the explosives, stopping the eruption and seemingly killing Hammonds in the process.

Afterward, Summerlee congratulates Challenger on the Challengerite, and they muse on how much longer they can keep the Lost World safe from human intervention.

Cast
 John Rhys-Davies as Professor George Edward Challenger
 David Warner as Professor Summerlee
 Eric McCormack as Edward Malone
 Nathania Stanford as Malu
 Darren Peter Mercer as Jim
 Tamara Gorski as Jenny Nielson
 Sala Came as Dan
 Fidelis Cheza as Chief Palala
 John Chinosiyani as Witch Doctor
 Innocent Choda as Pujo
 Brian Cooper as Policeman
 Charles David as Mojo Porter
 Kate Egan as Kate Crenshaw
 Mike Grey as Mojo Porter
 Robert Haber as Maple White
 Ian Yule as Peterson

Production

Filming

Filming for Return to the Lost World took place simultaneously with its predecessor The Lost World. The movie was filmed during 1991 in Zimbabwe.

Reception

The movie was released on March 9, 1992 in Canada.

Critical reception

The film Return to the Lost World was generally negative reviews upon release. 

TV Guide called it " essentially a retread of the slightly superior first picture".

Relation to novel
The films 1992 predecessor The Lost World was based on the 1912 book of the same name by Sir Arthur Conan Doyle.  The sequel Return to the Lost World is a continuation from The Lost World and contains its own story elements and plot that was not in the original novel.

References

External links 
 
 

1992 films
Canadian science fiction adventure films
1990s science fiction adventure films
1990s English-language films
Films about dinosaurs
Professor Challenger films
Films directed by Timothy Bond
1990s Canadian films